Ravin may refer to:
Idan Ravin, basketball coach
Emilie de Ravin (born 1981), Australian-American actress
Ravin Bay, bay in Antarctica
A spelling variation of Raven